Nikolas Sattlberger (born 18 January 2004) is an Austrian footballer who currently plays for Rapid Wien as a midfielder.

Club career
Sattlberger made his professional debut for Rapid Wien during first leg of UEFA Europa Conference League second qualifying round game against Lechia Gdańsk. Three days later he started his first Austrian Bundesliga game in the home match against Ried.

International career
Sattlberger has played internationally for Austria at under-15, under-16, under-17 and under-18 levels.

References

External links
 Nikolas Sattlberger at oefb.at
 
 

2004 births
Living people
Austrian footballers
Austria youth international footballers
Association football midfielders
Austrian Football Bundesliga players
SK Rapid Wien players